Alessandro Alvares da Silva (born 7 November 1970) is a Brazilian former professional footballer who played as a midfielder. He spent most of his career in Germany and played one season each in the Bundesliga and 2. Bundesliga.

References

External links

Profile at eintracht-archiv.de 

Living people
1970 births
Footballers from São Paulo
Association football midfielders
Brazilian footballers
Eintracht Frankfurt players
Eintracht Frankfurt II players
SV Wilhelmshaven players
Eintracht Braunschweig players
SC Paderborn 07 players
SV Waldhof Mannheim players
Bundesliga players
2. Bundesliga players
Brazilian expatriate footballers
Brazilian expatriate sportspeople in Germany
Expatriate footballers in Germany